The 2022 Holiday Bowl was a college football bowl game played on December 28, 2022, at Petco Park in San Diego, California. The 43rd annual Holiday Bowl, the game featured the Oregon Ducks from the Pac-12 Conference and the North Carolina Tar Heels from the Atlantic Coast Conference. The game began at 5:06 p.m. PST and was aired on Fox. It was one of the 2022–23 bowl games concluding the 2022 FBS football season. Sponsored by San Diego County Credit Union, the game was officially known as the San Diego County Credit Union Holiday Bowl.

Teams
Based on conference tie-ins, the game featured teams from the Atlantic Coast Conference and the Pac-12 Conference. This was the first meeting between the two teams. This was Oregon's fourth appearance in the Holiday Bowl, where they have gone 2-1 in previous appearances in 2000 (won against Texas Longhorns 35–30), 2005 (lost against Oklahoma Sooners 14–17), and 2008 (won against Oklahoma State Cowboys 42–31). This was North Carolina's first appearance in the Holiday Bowl.

Oregon Ducks

The Ducks entered the game ranked 15th in the AP Poll (15th in the CFP Poll), with a 9–3 record (7–2 in conference). The Ducks finished in third place in the Pac-12. Oregon was 3–3 against ranked teams.

North Carolina Tar Heels

The Tar Heels entered the game with a 9–4 record (6–2 in conference). The Tar Heels finished in first place in the ACC's Coastal Division, but lost in the 2022 ACC Championship Game to the Clemson Tigers, 39–10.  North Carolina was 0–1 against ranked teams.

Game summary

Statistics

References

Holiday Bowl
Holiday Bowl
Holiday Bowl
Holiday Bowl
Oregon Ducks football bowl games
North Carolina Tar Heels football bowl games